Senator Lang may refer to:

Andrew Lang (Minnesota politician) (born 1979), Minnesota State Senate
Mike Lang (Montana politician) (born 1949), Montana State Senate